Virgil Lusk Hill Jr. (born April 2, 1938) is a retired rear admiral in the United States Navy. He was Superintendent of the United States Naval Academy in Annapolis, Maryland from August 18, 1988 to June 15, 1991. Hill attended Iowa State University for one year on a Navy Reserve Officer Training Corps Scholarship prior to his four years at the United States Naval Academy, where he graduated with distinction in 1961, receiving his diploma from President John F. Kennedy.  There he was a candidate for a Rhodes scholarship. Following graduation he went directly into the Nuclear Submarine Service.  After retiring from the U.S. Navy in 1993, he was president of Valley Forge Military Academy and Collegein Wayne, Pennsylvania, before retiring seven years later. He was then asked to teach Leadership and Ethics in the Business School at Villanova University, where he taught for two years.

References

Superintendents of the United States Naval Academy
People from High Point, North Carolina
1938 births
Living people